Oregon School for the Deaf (OSD) is a state school in Salem, Oregon, United States. It serves deaf and hard of hearing students from kindergarten through high school, and up to 18 years of age.

History
Established in November 1870 by the Oregon Legislative Assembly as the Deaf and Mute Institute to provide free public education to deaf children, it is one of the oldest continuously operating schools in Oregon. It is operated by the Oregon Department of Education, and has been accredited by Northwest Association of Accredited Schools since 2004 and also by the Conference of Educational Administrators of Schools and Programs for the Deaf.

Academics
ESP is a program to teach living skills to students who have modified diplomas or certificates. OSD offers honors, AP and career courses. It serves students who are deaf or hard of hearing in their Community Based Instruction program.

As of the 2004–05 academic year, the total full-time enrollment of the school, exclusive of cooperative programs with local school districts, was between 125 and 135.

In 2005, by order of the state legislature included in its annual appropriation for the school, study was begun on the potential benefit of moving the Oregon School for the Blind to the OSD campus. 
Oregon Superintendent of Public Instruction Susan Castillo rejected a proposal for services now provided by the school to be provided instead through contracts with other public or private institutions.

Facilities
The school has a dormitory facility.

Buildings named in honor of staff and alumni

 Clatterbuck Services Facility, in honor of Superintendent Dr. Marvin B. Clatterbuck
 Hokanson Gym, in honor of Conrad Hokanson, pioneering basketball coach whose descendants still attend the school
 Kuenzi Hall, in honor of Lewis Kuenzi, alumni and long-time staff
 Lindstrom Hall, in honor of Thomas Lindstrom, long-time teacher, two-time acting superintendent
 Peck Multipurpose Building, in honor of William "Bill" Peck, long-time teacher and director of school
 Peterson Hall, in honor of Ruth Peterson, long-time girls' supervisor
 Tillinghast Cottage, in honor of Superintendent Edward Tillinghast
 Ulmer Hall, in honor of Thomas Ulmer, long-time teacher
 Wallace Hall, in honor of Ruth Wallace, long-time supervisor of the pre-school dormitory
 Wynkoop-Smith Library, in honor of William Stephen Smith and Cora (Wynkoop) Smith, the school's founder and his wife

The main building and school building were razed in December 1975 without authorization from the State Legislature.

Extreme Makeover: Home Edition
In Episode 172 of Extreme Makeover: Home Edition, a special Halloween episode, Ty and the gang help renovate the school's Nightmare Factory, which is a haunted house in which the proceeds are used to keep the school afloat. Instead of Ty shouting with his bullhorn to surprise the school, he sends a small plane with a visual message while the staff and students are having their annual barbecue. While the students are in Minnesota getting new hearing aids, the team builds a new dormitory for the boys as their old dorms along with the Nightmare Factory were considered unsafe to live in. Guest stars include actress Marlee Matlin and Rob Zombie.

Since then, the new dormitory has been rarely utilized due to budget constrictions.

Nightmare Factory
The haunted house was founded in 1987.

See also 
 Deaf culture

References

External links 

State Superintendent Report from 1897

Educational institutions established in 1870
High schools in Salem, Oregon
Boarding schools in Oregon
Schools for the deaf in the United States
Government of Oregon
Schools accredited by the Northwest Accreditation Commission
Public high schools in Oregon
Public middle schools in Oregon
Public elementary schools in Oregon
Public K-12 schools in the United States
Public boarding schools in the United States
1870 establishments in Oregon